Abiola Adedeji Dauda  (born on 3 February 1988) is a Nigerian professional footballer who plays as a forward for I-League club Mohammedan.

Early life
Dauda has vertical scars under each of his eyes which are family markings that were given to him shortly after birth. He has eleven siblings in his family.

Club career

Early career
Dauda was discovered in Nigeria by an agent Victor Mcdonald at age eighteen. He was playing with Grassroot Highlanders. Mcdonald helped him to get signed with Swedish fourth tier club Sölvesborgs GoIF. His time there was very successful and he was named the best forward of the division in 2007 which made several Allsvenskan clubs want to sign him.

Kalmar
In the end he decided to join Kalmar FF the following year. During his time there he very rarely got to play the full 90 minutes in games but he still had a prolific 2012 season where he scored a total of 14 goals. After the season had ended he declared that he was leaving the club to look for a new challenge. During his spell with Kalmar, he won the Swedish championship in 2008 and the Swedish Supercup in 2009, besides having been twice runner-up of the Swedish Cup, in 2008 and 2011.

Red Star Belgrade
On 8 February 2013, which was the last day of the transfer market window in Jelen Super Liga Dauda signed a contract with Red Star Belgrade. The first occasion on which Dauda scored for Red Star came on 3 April 2013, when he scored two goals and provided an assist for teammate Darko Lazović in a 3–0 win at home against Hajduk Kula.

Vitesse
On 21 July 2014, Red Star Belgrade announced they had agreed a €500,000 fee for the transfer of Dauda to Eredivisie club Vitesse Arnhem.

Heart of Midlothian
On 1 February 2016, Scottish Premiership side Heart of Midlothian signed him on a loan deal for the remainder of the season. He scored his first goals for the club when he scored a brace in the league against Ross County on 10 February 2016.

Atromitos 
On 9 January 2017, Dauda signed a one-and-a-half-year contract with Greek Superleague club Atromitos on a free transfer from Vitesse. His five goals in the 2016–17 Greek Cup made him top scorer for the season.

Dauda scored as Atromitos beat AEK Athens 1–0 to go top of the table on 23 October 2017. His goal on 28 January 2018 secured a 1–0 home win over AEL, and two goals in the last match of the season took his personal total to nine. The 4–0 home win against Kerkyra gave Atromitos a fourth-place finish.

Giresunspor 
Dauda spent the 2018–19 season with TFF First League (Turkish second-tier) club Giresunspor, for which he scored 12 goals from 28 league appearances.

AEL 
Dauda returned to the Greek Superleague with AEL on a three-year contract.

Panetolikos 
On 16 January 2020, following his release from AEL, he joined Panetolikos on a six-month contract. In his debut, two days later, he salvaged a point in a home game against Lamia, with a last-minute penalty. On 22 January 2020, Abiola Dauda, who recently moved from Larissa to Panetolikos a few days ago, struck a brace, first in the 28th minute after dribbling past the goalkeeper and slotting the ball into the net, and in the 63rd minute when his left-footed strike gave the visitors a 0–2 lead in a thrilling 2–2 away draw against AEL.

Apollon Smyrnis 
On 4 September 2020, he signed with Apollon Smyrnis on a free transfer.

Career statistics

Club

Honours

Kalmar FF
Allsvenskan: 2008
Svenska Supercupen: 2009

Red Star
 Serbian SuperLiga: 2013–14

Vitesse Arnhem
KNVB Cup: 2016–17

Mohammedan Sporting
CFL Premier Division A: 2022

Individual
Greek Cup Top goalscorer: 2016–17

References

External links

Living people
1988 births
Sportspeople from Lagos
Association football forwards
Nigerian footballers
Nigerian expatriate footballers
Kalmar FF players
Red Star Belgrade footballers
SBV Vitesse players
Heart of Midlothian F.C. players
Atromitos F.C. players
Giresunspor footballers
Athlitiki Enosi Larissa F.C. players
Panetolikos F.C. players
Apollon Smyrnis F.C. players
Allsvenskan players
Serbian SuperLiga players
Eredivisie players
Scottish Professional Football League players
Super League Greece players
TFF First League players
Expatriate footballers in Sweden
Expatriate footballers in Serbia
Expatriate footballers in the Netherlands
Expatriate footballers in Scotland
Expatriate footballers in Greece
Expatriate footballers in Turkey
Nigerian expatriate sportspeople in Serbia
Nigerian expatriate sportspeople in the Netherlands
Nigerian expatriate sportspeople in Scotland
Nigerian expatriate sportspeople in Greece
Nigerian expatriate sportspeople in Turkey
Nigerian emigrants to Sweden
Naturalized citizens of Sweden
Yoruba sportspeople
Mohammedan SC (Kolkata) players